The Yadkin Church is a historic church building on Upper Janes Creek Road in rural Randolph County, Arkansas, north of Ravenden Springs.  Built about 1894, it is a single-story wood-frame structure, with a gabled roof and clapboarded exterior.  The main entrance is on the otherwise unadorned northeast face, and consists of a pair of paneled doors.  Sash windows line the side walls, with one on the rear wall.  It is the only significant surviving element of the town of Yadkin, which was a thriving farm community in the early 20th century.  It was last used for regular services about 1950.

The building was listed on the National Register of Historic Places in 2019.

See also
National Register of Historic Places listings in Randolph County, Arkansas

References

Churches on the National Register of Historic Places in Arkansas
Churches completed in 1894
Buildings and structures in Randolph County, Arkansas
National Register of Historic Places in Randolph County, Arkansas